is a railway station in the town of Funagata, Yamagata, Japan, operated by East Japan Railway Company (JR East).

Lines
Nagasawa Station is served by the Rikuu East Line, and is located 82.8 rail kilometers from the terminus of the line at Kogota Station.

Station layout
The station has one side platform, serving a bidirectional single track. The station is unattended.

History
Nagasawa Station opened on November 1, 1915. The station was absorbed into the JR East network upon the privatization of JNR on April 1, 1987.

Surrounding area
Nagasawa Post Office

See also
List of railway stations in Japan

External links

  JR East Station information 

Railway stations in Yamagata Prefecture
Rikuu East Line
Railway stations in Japan opened in 1915
Funagata, Yamagata